Brian Clifford Evans (2 December 1942 – 26 February 2003) was a Welsh footballer who played as a winger in the Football League for Swansea City and Hereford United. He made a total of 397 senior appearances for Swansea (excluding Welsh Cup appearances), and was capped 7 times for Wales. Brian Evans was the father of former footballer Richard Evans.

Career

After being spotted playing for Abergavenny Thursdays, Evans joined Swansea City in July 1963 for a fee of £650. Over the following decade Evans helped the side win the Welsh Cup in 1966 and promotion to Division Three during the 1969–70 season. In August 1973, he was sold to Hereford United for £7,000 as manager Harry Gregg was forced to sell several players before he was allowed to sign new players. After leaving Hereford in 1975, Evans moved into non-league football with spells at Bath City, Llanelli, Haverfordwest County and Pontardawe Town.

International career

Evans played for the Wales under-23 side and was also part of an FAW XI tour of Tahiti, New Zealand, Australia and Malaysia in 1971. He made his debut for the senior side on 13 October 1971 in a 3–0 win over Finland. He went on to make a further six appearances over the following two years, winning his final cap on 26 September 1973 in a 3–0 defeat to Poland.

Later life
After retiring from playing he ran a painting and decoration business in Swansea. He died at the age of 60 after a short battle with cancer.

References

1942 births
2003 deaths
Welsh footballers
Wales under-23 international footballers
Wales international footballers
Abergavenny Thursdays F.C. players
Swansea City A.F.C. players
Hereford United F.C. players
Llanelli Town A.F.C. players
Bath City F.C. players
Pontardawe Town F.C. players
English Football League players
Deaths from cancer in Wales
Association football wingers
Haverfordwest County A.F.C. players